is a passenger railway station  located in the city of Odawara, Kanagawa Prefecture, Japan, operated by the Izuhakone Railway.

Lines
Midorichō Station is served by the  Daiyūzan Line, and is located 0.4 kilometers from the line's terminus at Odawara Station.

Station layout
The station consists of a single side platform with a small rain shelter built on the platform. The station has no station building and is unmanned.

Adjacent stations

History
Midorichō Station was opened on June 14, 1935, when the Izuhakone Railway's Daiyūzan Line was extended from Sagami-Hirokoji to Shin-Odawara. Both of the adjacent stations went out of operation two days later; the line was then extended to Odawara Station.

Passenger statistics
In fiscal 2019, the station was used by an average of 228 passengers daily (boarding passengers only).

The passenger figures (boarding passengers only) for previous years are as shown below.

Surrounding area
The station is located in downtown Odawara, within sight of Odawara Station.

See also
List of railway stations in Japan

References

External links

Izuhakone Railway home page 

Railway stations in Kanagawa Prefecture
Railway stations in Japan opened in 1935
Izuhakone Daiyuzan Line
Railway stations in Odawara